Metrolina Christian Academy (MCA) is a private Christian school in Indian Trail, North Carolina, affiliated to the First Baptist Church of Indian Trail. The school claims to be the second largest Christian school in the state of North Carolina.

External links

Baptist schools in the United States
Christian schools in North Carolina
Private high schools in North Carolina
Private elementary schools in North Carolina
1992 establishments in North Carolina
Educational institutions established in 1992